Parapediasia tenuistrigatus is a moth in the family Crambidae. It was described by Zeller in 1881. It is found in Colombia and Honduras.

References

Crambini
Moths described in 1881
Moths of Central America
Moths of South America